Grease Creek is a stream in Alberta, Canada.

Grease Creek was so named on account of greasewood in the area.

See also
List of rivers of Alberta

References

Rivers of Alberta